The Roller Hockey Pan American Championship is a Rink Hockey competition  between the best male and female national teams from American Continent. It happens every two years and it is organized by CPRS.
The next Tournament will be disputed between 8th and 13 March, in Rosario, Argentina, and will be the 5th edition.

Men's Historical

Men's medal table

Women's Historical

Women's medal table

Men's U-19 Historical

Men's U-19 medal table

References

External links
South America Federation website
CIRH website
Official website of V Roller Hockey Pan American Games
 Confederation Argentina de Patinage
 Confederação Brasileira de Hóquei e Patinação
 The Canadian In-Line & Roller Skating Association
 Federatión Chilena de Hockey y Patinaje
 Federatión Colombiana de Patinaje
 Hockey Mexico
Federación Uruguaya de Patín y Hockey
Rink Hockey in the USA

Roller hockey competitions
Recurring sporting events established in 1979